Hajat may refer to:

Rafiq Hajat, Malawian civil rights activist
Hajat, Iran, a village in Kerman Province, Iran
Hajat, Lorestan, a village in Lorestan Province, Iran